TechWell Corporation (formerly Software Quality Engineering, SQE), was founded in 1986 by Bill Hetzel and David Gelperin as a consulting company to help organizations improve their software testing practices and produce higher quality software.

Company 

During the late 1980s, Hetzel and Gelperin developed a software testing methodology, the Software Test and Evaluation Process (STEP) and an accompanying training course called Systematic Software Testing.

During the 1990s, more than 10,000 testers from all parts of the world took this course and learned the STEP approach for testing.

Notably, SQE coined the term “Test Then Code” in 1987, many years before approaches like test-driven development (TDD).

SQE launched its first industry conference, Applications of Software Measurement (ASM) in 1991, followed by Software Testing, Analysis and Review (STAR) conference in 1992 and EuroSTAR in 1993.

In 1998, when the STAR conference in the United States had grown to attract more than 1,000 attendees, it was split into STAREAST and STARWEST.

In 1999, the company created a publishing division with the launch of Software Testing and Quality Engineering (STQE) magazine as well as a companion website (STQE.net).

In 2001, StickyMinds.com was launched. The name "StickyMinds" was inspired by the STQE name read: Sticky. In January 2004, the magazine name was changed to Better Software magazine to reflect the broader focus on the entire software lifecycle.

The company launched the Better Software conference in 2004, followed by the Agile Development Practices conference in 2007.

Conferences 
TechWell conferences have been recognized as top conferences in the industry and cover the software lifecycle:
 STAREAST Testing Conference  
 STARWEST Testing Conference 
 STARCANADA Testing Conference
 Agile+DevOps East
 Agile+DevOps West
 Agile Testing Days USA

Training 
In addition to conferences, SQE Training (a TechWell company) provides software improvement training across the entire software cycle.

SQE Training offers courses in the following topic areas: agile development, configuration management, DevOps, software testing, security, mobile development and testing, project management, software requirements, and development and testing tools.

SQE Training is a registered education provider for the PMI, as well a provider for certifications and continuing education for ScrumAlliance, ICAgile, and ISTQB.

Online Resources 
TechWell also provides free communities for software professionals with information on emerging trends, latest ideas, and industry news.

AgileConnection offers how-to advice on agile development principles, technologies and practices. Community members get access to articles, interviews, presentations, and Q&A discussions.

StickyMinds is a resource for software testers, SQA professionals, and anyone interested in improving software quality and features in-depth articles, interviews, and how-to advice on the latest in software testing.

TechWell Hub is a Slack community where software professionals engage in vivid conversations around agile, testing, DevOps, security, and more.

References 

Companies established in 1986